Chloé Bouquet Valentini (born 19 April 1995) is a French female handball player for Metz Handball and the French national team.

She represented France at the 2019 World Women's Handball Championship.

References

External links

1995 births
Living people
French female handball players
Handball players at the 2020 Summer Olympics
Medalists at the 2020 Summer Olympics
Olympic medalists in handball
Olympic gold medalists for France